The Rajya Sabha, constitutionally the Council of States, is the upper house of the bicameral Parliament of India. , it has a maximum membership of 245, of which 233 are elected by the legislatures of the states and union territories using single transferable votes through open ballots, while the president can appoint 12 members for their contributions to art, literature, science, and social services. The potential seating capacity of the Rajya Sabha is 245 (233 elected, 12 appointed), according to article 80 of the Indian Constitution. Members sit for staggered terms lasting six years, with about a third of the 238 designates up for election every two years, in even-numbered years. Unlike the Lok Sabha, the Rajya Sabha is a continuing chamber and hence not subject to dissolution. However, the Rajya Sabha, like the Lok Sabha, can be prorogued by the president.

The Rajya Sabha has equal footing in legislation with the Lok Sabha, except in the area of supply, where the latter has overriding powers. In the case of conflicting legislation, a joint sitting of the two houses can be held, where the Lok Sabha would hold a greater influence because of its larger membership. The vice president of India (currently, Jagdeep Dhankhar) is the ex-officio chairman of the Rajya Sabha, who presides over its sessions. The deputy chairman, who is elected from amongst the house's members, takes care of the day-to-day matters of the house in the absence of the chairman. The Rajya Sabha held its first sitting on 13 May 1952.

The Rajya Sabha meets in the eponymous chamber in Parliament House in New Delhi. Since 18 July 2018, the Rajya Sabha has the facility for simultaneous interpretation in all the 22 scheduled languages of India.

Qualifications

Article 84 of the Constitution lays down the qualifications for membership of Parliament. A member of the Rajya Sabha must:
 Be a citizen of India.
 Make and subscribe before some person authorized in that behalf by the Election Commission an oath or affirmation according to the form set out for the purpose in the Third Schedule to the Constitution.
 Be at least 30 years old. (article 84 constitution of India)
 Be elected by the Legislative Assembly of States and Union territories by means of single transferable vote through proportional representation.
 Not be a proclaimed criminal.
 Not be a subject of insolvency, i.e. they should not be in debt that they are not capable of repaying in a current manner and should have the ability to meet their financial expenses.
 Not hold any other office of profit under the Government of India.
 Not be of unsound mind.
 Possess such other qualifications as may be prescribed in that behalf by or under any law made by Parliament.

In addition, twelve members are nominated by the president of India having special knowledge in various areas like arts and science. However, they are not entitled to vote in presidential elections as per Article 55 of the Constitution.

Limitations
The Constitution of India places some restrictions on the Rajya Sabha, and the Lok Sabha (the lower house, House of People) is more powerful in certain areas.

Money bills
The definition of a money bill is given in Article 110 of the Constitution of India. A money bill can be introduced only in the Lok Sabha by a minister and only on the recommendation of the president of India. When the Lok Sabha passes a money bill then the Lok Sabha sends the money bill to the Rajya Sabha for 14 days during which it can make recommendations. Even if the Rajya Sabha fails to return the money bill in 14 days to the Lok Sabha, that bill is deemed to have passed by both houses. Also, if the Lok Sabha rejects any (or all) of the amendments proposed by the Rajya Sabha, the bill is deemed to have been passed by both houses of Parliament in the form the Lok Sabha finally passes it. Hence, the Rajya Sabha can only give recommendations for a money bill, but the Rajya Sabha cannot amend a money bill. This is to ensure that the Rajya Sabha must not add any non-money matters to the money bill. There is no joint sitting of both the houses for money bills, because all final decisions are taken by the Lok Sabha.

Joint Sitting of the Parliament

Article 108 provides for a joint sitting of the two houses of Parliament in certain cases. A joint sitting can be convened by the president of India when one house has either rejected a bill passed by the other house, has not taken any action on a bill transmitted to it by the other house for six months, or has disagreed with the amendments proposed by the Lok Sabha on a bill passed by it. Considering that the numerical strength of the Lok Sabha is more than twice that of the Rajya Sabha, the Lok Sabha tends to have a greater influence in a joint sitting of Parliament. A joint session is chaired by the speaker of the Lok Sabha. Also, because the joint session is convened by the president on the advice of the government, which already has a majority in the Lok Sabha, the joint session is usually convened to get bills passed through a Rajya Sabha in which the government has a minority.

Joint sessions of Parliament are a rarity, and have been convened three times in the last 71 years, for passage of a specific legislative act, the latest time being in 2002:
 1961: Dowry Prohibition Act, 1958
 1978: Banking Services Commission (Repeal) Act, 1977
 2002: Prevention of Terrorism Act, 2002

No-confidence motion
Unlike the Lok Sabha,members of the Rajya Sabha cannot bring to the house a no-confidence motion against the government.

Powers

In the Indian federal structure, the Rajya Sabha is a representative of the states in the union legislature (hence the name, Council of States). For this reason, the Rajya Sabha has powers that protect the rights of states against the union government.

Union-State relations
The Constitution empowers the Parliament of India to make laws on the matters reserved for states. However, this can only be done if the Rajya Sabha first passes a resolution by a two-third majority granting such a power to the union parliament. The union government cannot make a law on a matter reserved for states without any authorisation from the Rajya Sabha.

The union government reserves the power to make laws directly affecting the citizens across all the states whereas, a single state in itself reserves the power to make rules and governing laws of their region. If any bill passes through the Rajya Sabha, that means, majority of states of the union want that to happen. The Rajya Sabha, therefore, plays a vital role in protecting the states' culture and interests.

Creation of All-India services
The Rajya Sabha, by a two-thirds supermajority, can pass a resolution empowering the Indian government to create more all-India services common to both the union and the states.

Membership by party

Members of the Rajya Sabha by their political party:

Composition

Seats are allotted in degressive proportion to the population of each state or union territory, meaning that smaller states have a slight advantage over more populous states. Certain states even have more representatives than states more populous than them, because in past they too had high population. For example, Tamil Nadu has 18 representatives for 72 million inhabitants (in 2011) whereas Bihar (104 million) and West Bengal (91 million) only have 16. As the members are elected by the state legislature, some small union territories, those without legislatures, cannot have representation. Hence, Andaman and Nicobar Islands, Chandigarh, Dadra and Nagar Haveli and Daman and Diu, Ladakh and Lakshadweep do not send any representatives. Twelve members are nominated by the president.

As per the Fourth Schedule to the Constitution of India on 26 January 1950, the Rajya Sabha was to consist of 216 members, of which 12 members were to be nominated by the president and the remaining 204 elected to represent the states. The present sanctioned strength of the Rajya Sabha in the Constitution of India is 250, which can be increased by constitutional amendment. However, the present strength is 245 members according to the Representation of People Act, 1951, which can be increased up to 250 by amending the act itself, of whom 233 are representatives of the states and union territories and 12 are nominated by the president. The 12 nominated members of the Rajya Sabha are persons who are eminent in particular fields and are well-known contributors in the particular field.

Number of members by state/union territory

Officers

Leader of the House

Besides the chairman (vice-president of India) and the deputy chairman, there is also a position called leader of the House. This is a cabinet minister – the prime minister if they are a member of the House or another nominated minister. The leader has a seat next to the chairman, in the front row.

Leader of the Opposition

Besides the leader of the House, who is the government's chief representative in the House, there is also a leader of the opposition (LOP) – leading the opposition parties. The function was only recognized in the Salary and Allowances of Leaders of the Opposition in Parliament Act, 1977. This is commonly the leader of the largest non-government party and is recognized as such by the chairman.

Secretariat
The Secretariat of the Rajya Sabha was set up under the provisions contained in Article 98 of the Constitution. The said Article, which provides for a separate secretarial staff for each house of Parliament, reads as follows:- 98. Secretariat of Parliament – Each House of Parliament shall have a separate secretarial staff: Provided that nothing in this clause shall be construed as preventing the creation of posts common to both Houses of Parliament. (2) Parliament may by law regulate the recruitment and the conditions of service of persons appointed to the secretarial staff of either House of Parliament.

The Rajya Sabha Secretariat functions under the overall guidance and control of the chairman. The main activities of the Secretariat inter alia include the following :

(i) providing secretarial assistance and support to the effective functioning of the Council of States (Rajya Sabha); (ii) providing amenities as admissible to Members of Rajya Sabha; (iii) servicing the various Parliamentary Committees;
(iv) preparing research and reference material and bringing out various publications;
(v) recruitment of manpower in the Sabha Secretariat and attending to personnel matters; and
(vi) preparing and publishing a record of the day-to-day proceedings of the Rajya Sabha and bringing out such other publications, as may be required concerning the functioning of the Rajya Sabha and its Committees.

In the discharge of their constitutional and statutory responsibilities, the chairman of the Rajya Sabha is assisted by the secretary-general, who holds the rank equivalent to the cabinet secretary to the government of India. The secretary-general, in turn, is assisted by senior functionaries at the level of secretary, additional secretary, joint secretary and other officers and staff of the secretariat. The present secretary-general is Pramod Chandra Mody. In the winter 2019 session, uniforms of Rajya Sabha marshals were restyled from traditional Indian attire comprising turbans to dark navy blue and olive green military-style outfits with caps.

Media

Rajya Sabha TV (RSTV) is a 24-hour parliamentary television channel owned and operated by the Rajya Sabha. The channel aims to provide in-depth coverage and analysis of parliamentary affairs, especially its functioning and policy development. During sessions, RSTV provides live coverage and presents an analysis of the proceedings of the house as well as other day-to-day parliamentary events and developments.

Now it has been merged in SansadTV along with LSTV and are being run by same channel.

See also 
Lok Sabha
List of current members of the Rajya Sabha
State legislative councils of India
Secretary General of the Rajya Sabha

References

Further reading
 The Nominated Members of India's Council of States: A Study of Role-Definition J. H. Proctor, Legislative Studies Quarterly, Vol. 10, No. 1, Feb 1985, pp. 53–70.

External links
 

 
Parliament of India
India